The 2013 ServiceMaster 200 was the 32nd stock car race of the 2013 NASCAR Nationwide Series and the 15th iteration of the event. The race was held on Saturday, November 9, 2013, in Avondale, Arizona at Phoenix International Raceway, a 1-mile (1.6 km) permanent low-banked tri-oval race track. The race took the scheduled 200 laps to complete. At race's end, Kyle Busch, driving for Joe Gibbs Racing, would dominate the race to win his 63rd career NASCAR Nationwide Series win and his 12th and final win of the season. To fill out the podium, Justin Allgaier of Turner Scott Motorsports and Austin Dillon of Richard Childress Racing would finish second and third, respectively.

Background 

Phoenix International Raceway – also known as PIR – is a one-mile, low-banked tri-oval race track located in Avondale, Arizona. It is named after the nearby metropolitan area of Phoenix. The motorsport track opened in 1964 and currently hosts two NASCAR race weekends annually. PIR has also hosted the IndyCar Series, CART, USAC and the Rolex Sports Car Series. The raceway is currently owned and operated by International Speedway Corporation.

The raceway was originally constructed with a 2.5 mi (4.0 km) road course that ran both inside and outside of the main tri-oval. In 1991 the track was reconfigured with the current 1.51 mi (2.43 km) interior layout. PIR has an estimated grandstand seating capacity of around 67,000. Lights were installed around the track in 2004 following the addition of a second annual NASCAR race weekend.

Entry list 

 (R) denotes rookie driver.
 (i) denotes driver who is ineligible for series driver points.

Practice

First practice 
The first practice session was held on Friday, November 8, at 10:00 AM MST, and would last for an hour and 30 minutes.

Second and final practice 
The second and final practice session, sometimes referred to as Happy Hour, was held on Friday, November 8, at 1:35 PM MST, and would last for 45 minutes.

Qualifying 
Qualifying was held on Saturday, November 9, at 10:35 AM MST. Each driver would have two laps to set a fastest time; the fastest of the two would count as their official qualifying lap.

Two drivers would fail to qualify: Morgan Shepherd and Dexter Stacey.

Full qualifying results

Race results

Standings after the race 

Drivers' Championship standings

Note: Only the first 10 positions are included for the driver standings.

References 

2013 NASCAR Nationwide Series
NASCAR races at Phoenix Raceway
November 2013 sports events in the United States
2013 in sports in Arizona